Richard Ross Eyer (born May 6, 1945) is an American former child actor who worked during the 1950s and 1960s. He then became a teacher and taught at elementary schools in Bishop, California until he retired in 2006. He is the older brother of Robert Eyer (1948-2005), another child actor of the period.

Career
Eyer played a war orphan in "Homeward Borne", an episode of Playhouse 90, August 22, 1957, on CBS.

In 1956, he played a boy named Chuck in Canyon River which starred George Montgomery and Peter Graves. He had the starring role in The Invisible Boy, producer Nicholas Nayfack's independent sequel to MGM's Forbidden Planet.

In The Desperate Hours (1955), Eyer played Fredric March's dangerously impulsive son. He also starred in the 1958 western Fort Dobbs, with Clint Walker and Virginia Mayo and The 7th Voyage of Sinbad in 1958, in which he portrayed the metallic-voiced Barani the Genie.

In a 1995 interview, Eyer credited his mother for the promotion of his acting career. "It was all her work that did it. I had curly hair, freckles, and people would say what a cute kid he was and all that; so my mother entered me in some children's personality contests, and I won one of these which had been held at the Hollywood Bowl, and I guess that one was the springboard in getting me started. After that, I was hired for some television commercials and some modeling jobs, and this led into other things ... I was around fourteen when I did Stagecoach West ... My last role was at age 21, appearing in an episode of [ABC's] Combat!.

He appeared in more than one hundred episodes of various television programs, including Rod Cameron's syndicated City Detective, when he was eight years of age. Other appearances include Arrest and Trial, Stoney Burke, Mr. Novak, Wagon Train, Wanted: Dead or Alive, Father Knows Best, Gunsmoke, Lassie, Rawhide and General Electric Theater.

Personal life
Eyer is divorced. He is the father of Samantha Rae Eyer, and twin sons, Benjamin Adam Eyer and Andrew Z. Eyer.

Filmography

References

Bibliography

 Holmstrom, John (1996). The Moving Picture Boy: An International Encyclopaedia from 1895 to 1995. Norwich: Michael Russell, p. 253.

External links
 

Living people
1945 births
20th-century American male actors
American male child actors
American male television actors
American male film actors
Male actors from Santa Monica, California
People from Bishop, California